Nigel Kennedy (born 28 December 1956) is an English violinist and violist.

Discovered by Jimmy Savile on a British television series aged 11, his early career was primarily spent performing classical music, and he has since expanded into jazz, klezmer, and other music genres.

Early life and background
Kennedy's grandfather was Lauri Kennedy, principal cellist with the BBC Symphony Orchestra, and his grandmother was Dorothy Kennedy, a pianist. Lauri and Dorothy Kennedy were Australian, while their son, the cellist John Kennedy, was born in England. After graduating from the Royal Academy of Music in London, at age 22, John joined the Royal Liverpool Philharmonic Orchestra, later becoming the principal cellist of Sir Thomas Beecham's Royal Philharmonic Orchestra. While in England, John developed a relationship with an English pianist, Scylla Stoner, with whom he eventually toured in 1952 as part of the Llewellyn-Kennedy Piano Trio (with the violinist Ernest Llewellyn; Stoner was billed as "Scylla Kennedy" after she and John married). But they ultimately divorced, and John returned to Australia.

Kennedy was born in Brighton. A boy prodigy, as a 10-year-old he picked out Fats Waller tunes on the piano after hearing his stepfather's jazz records. At the age of 7, he became a pupil at the Yehudi Menuhin School of Music. He later studied at the Juilliard School in New York City with Dorothy DeLay. While there he helped to pay for his studies by busking with fellow student and cellist Thomas Demenga.

Kennedy has about 30 close relatives in Australia, whom he visits whenever he tours there.

Musical career

Until 2000
At the age of 16, Kennedy was invited by jazz violinist Stéphane Grappelli to appear with him at New York's Carnegie Hall. He made his recording debut in 1984 with Elgar's Violin Concerto. His subsequent recording of Vivaldi's The Four Seasons with the English Chamber Orchestra in 1989 sold over two million copies and earned a place as one of the best-selling of all classical recordings. The album remained at the top of the UK classical charts for over a year, with total sales of over three million units.

In 1992, Kennedy announced the end of his career in classical music. Around this time, he recorded the album Music in Colours with Stephen Duffy. He returned to the international concert platform in the mid-1990s. In 1997, he received an award for Outstanding Contribution to British Music at the BRIT Awards, and in 2001 received the 'Male Artist of the Year' award.

In other music genres, Kennedy recorded a cover of Jimi Hendrix's "Fire" for the 1993 album Stone Free: A Tribute to Jimi Hendrix. The same year, he made an appearance on Robert Plant's solo album Fate of Nations on the track "Calling to you". In 1999, Sony Classical released The Kennedy Experience, which featured improvisational recordings based on Hendrix compositions. Kennedy's autobiography, Always Playing, was published in 1991.

Since 2000
In 2000, he recorded Riders on the Storm: The Doors Concerto (with Jaz Coleman), a violin-based orchestral version of Doors songs, including "Strange Days", "L.A. Woman", "The End", and "Riders on the Storm". On 27 November 2000, Kennedy joined rock group The Who at the Royal Albert Hall to play the violin solo in the song "Baba O'Riley", released three years later on the album Live at the Royal Albert Hall. Kennedy also played on several tracks – including "Experiment IV" – by British singer-songwriter Kate Bush, who was a guest on Kennedy's episode of This Is Your Life. He was featured on two of Sarah Brightman's songs for her 2003 album Harem. He has explored Klezmer music with the Polish jazz band Kroke. In late 2005, Kennedy recorded his first album for the Blue Note jazz label, released as Blue Note Sessions, with Ron Carter on double bass, Jack DeJohnette on drums and saxophonist Joe Lovano.

Kennedy returned to the 2008 Proms after an absence of 21 years, performing Elgar's Violin Concerto and a late-night Prom with the Nigel Kennedy Quintet. He was appointed artistic director of the Polish Chamber Orchestra and in 2010, founded the Orchestra of Life, an ensemble of mainly Polish musicians.

In August 2013, he again returned to the Proms performing The Four Seasons at a concert featuring Kennedy with a group of young Palestinian musicians, the Palestine Strings from the Edward Said Conservatory of Music, and the Orchestra of Life. According to Michael Church of The Independent, in the first movement "Spring", Kennedy "swerved off-course with a flurry of bird-tweets followed by a jazz riff from his bassist; the staccato chords of the next movement were decorated by a microtonal Arabic riff from one of the guest players". Near the end of the concert, the BBC removed the violinist's attribution of apartheid to Israel from the television broadcast on BBC4. The comments were broadcast live on BBC Radio 3. A representative of the Corporation said they did not "fall within the editorial remit of the Proms as a classical music festival." Kennedy said:
 Kennedy objected to the removal of his remarks from the broadcast. A condition of the booking, to which Kennedy had agreed, was not making such a comment, according to his manager.

Kennedy also plays the viola, and has recorded Sir William Walton's Viola Concerto. Kennedy's own compositions include incidental music for Chekhov's play Three Sisters. Kennedy published his second autobiography, Nigel Kennedy Uncensored!, in 2021.

Image

In 1991, the Controller of BBC Radio 3 John Drummond criticised Kennedy describing him as "a Liberace for the nineties" and objected to his "ludicrous" clothes and "self-invented accent".

Until 2006, Kennedy expressed his intention of not appearing on the classical London concert scene with a London orchestra, which was seen by some as arrogance, although he rationalised it in terms of frustrated perfectionism:

It all comes down to the amount of rehearsal you get, or don't get, in this country. I insist on three or four sessions prior to a concert, and orchestral administrators won't accommodate that. If I didn't care about getting it right, I could do three concerts in the same amount of time and earn three times the money. But you can't do something properly in less time than it takes.

Kennedy expresses a preference for the immediate appeal of live performance, and often records entire works or movements in single takes to preserve this sense in his recordings. He also introduces improvised elements to his performances, as in his Jimi Hendrix-inspired cadenza to Beethoven's Violin Concerto and his jazz and fusion recordings.

In September 2021, Kennedy cancelled a performance at the Royal Albert Hall after the host, Classic FM, prevented him from including a Jimi Hendrix composition at the concert. He had intended to perform a version of "Little Wing" in the manner of Ralph Vaughan Williams

Personal life and politics
Kennedy was romantically involved with singer/guitarist Brix Smith after she had broken up from and divorced husband Mark E. Smith in 1989. Kennedy currently divides his time among residences in Malvern, Worcestershire (where his former girlfriend Eve Westmore and son Sark Yves Amadeus b.1997 reside), London and Kraków, Poland. He has been married twice; his second wife, Agnieszka (née Chowniec), is a Polish actress and artistic director, born in April 1977.

Kennedy acknowledges regularly smoking cannabis to aid his creativity.

Football
Kennedy is an Aston Villa F.C. supporter. At Przystanek Woodstock 2010, he had his orchestra wear Aston Villa shirts and led the crowd in the team's chants. While living and recording in Poland, he also took an active interest in KS Cracovia, in whose 100th anniversary club replica kit he appeared.

Politics
Kennedy is an avowed socialist. He supported David Davis's campaign when he quit his Shadow Home Secretary post to force a by-election, in protest over proposals to allow terrorist suspects to be locked up for 42 days without charge. Kennedy is a vocal opponent of Israel's policies in the West Bank, and, in the summer of 2007, he told a Haaretz reporter:

Honours
In 1991, he was awarded an honorary degree (Doctor of Letters, or Litt.D.) by the University of Bath.

Discography

References

External links

 Kennedy's discography at EMI Classics
 The Kennedy Experience at Sony Classical
 
 Television Interview with Nigel Kennedy from C Music TV

1956 births
Living people
21st-century British male musicians
21st-century classical violinists
British expatriates in Poland
British male violinists
British socialists
British violinists
EMI Classics and Virgin Classics artists
English classical musicians
English classical violinists
English classical violists
English violinists
English violists
Electric violinists
Juilliard School alumni
Male classical violinists
Penguin Cafe Orchestra members
People educated at Yehudi Menuhin School
People from Brighton
21st-century violists